Scott Hall (1958–2022) was an American professional wrestler.

Scott Hall may also refer to:

People
 Scott Hall, former bassist of the Christian rock band Bride
 Darwin Scott Hall (1844–1919), U.S. Representative from Minnesota
 Scott Hall (trumpeter), American jazz trumpeter, composer, and educator 
 Scott S. Hall, psychology and behavioral science professor and researcher at Stanford University
 Scott F. Hall, the musician and luthier who codeveloped the Hornucopian dronepipe

Places
 Scott Hall, Leeds, a suburb of Leeds, West Yorkshire, England, United Kingdom
 Scott Hall, an academic building located on Rutgers University's Voorhees Mall in New Brunswick, New Jersey, United States
 Thomas Scott Memorial Orange Hall, building in Winnipeg, Manitoba, Canada
 Scott Hall, an administrative building on the Campus of Lafayette College, Easton, Pennsylvania, United States
 Scott's Hall, Jamaica

See also
 Hall-Scott, an American manufacturing company
 Scot's Hall, a manor house in England
Hall, Scott